Hamilton Lake is a lake in Alberta, Canada.

Hamilton Lake has the name of E. H. Hamilton, a government surveyor.

See also
List of lakes of Alberta

References

Lakes of Alberta